The pied triller (Lalage nigra) is a species of bird in the family Campephagidae.
It is found in Brunei, India, Indonesia, Malaysia, the Philippines, Singapore, and Thailand.

Gallery

References

pied triller
Birds of Malesia
pied triller
Articles containing video clips
Taxonomy articles created by Polbot